The Barony of Gritzena or Gritsena was a medieval Frankish fiefdom of the Principality of Achaea, located in eastern Messenia, in the Peloponnese peninsula in Greece, centred on the settlement of Gritzena.

History 
The Barony of Gritzena was established , after the conquest of the Peloponnese by the Crusaders, and was one of the original twelve secular baronies within the Principality of Achaea. The various versions of the Chronicle of the Morea mention that the barony comprised four knight's fiefs, and was located in the region of Lakkoi (the upper Messenian plain, between Kalamata and Skorta), under a certain Lucas (Λούκας), of whom nothing other than his name is known.

The Barony of Gritzena is little-known. It remained a peaceful backwater until the Byzantine attacks of the 1260s, and there is no evidence of a castle being constructed there; it is hence impossible to establish its exact location. If Antoine Bon's equation of "La Grite" with Gritzea is correct, the barony re-appears only , when it was controlled by Geoffrey of Durnay, who had possibly received it as compensation for the loss of his family's Barony of Kalavryta to the Byzantine Greeks of Mystras. It then disappears again from the sources along with the Durnay family, at the end of the 13th century.

References

Sources
 
 

States and territories established in 1209
States and territories disestablished in the 13th century
Baronies of the Principality of Achaea
Medieval Messenia